EVSC Double Cola Soccer Complex is a high school soccer complex located in Evansville, Indiana near the old site of Roberts Stadium.  Owned and operated by the Evansville Vanderburgh School Corporation, the facility serves as a home, or alternate field, for EVSC schools. Double Cola is the frequent host of the [[IHSAA] soccer sectional 16.

See also
Sports in Evansville
Goebel Soccer Complex

References

Parks in Southwestern Indiana
Soccer venues in Indiana
Sports venues in Evansville, Indiana
Sports complexes in the United States